Solomon Terry Kindley (born July 3, 1997) is an American football guard for the New York Giants of the National Football League (NFL). He played college football at Georgia.

College career
During his redshirt freshman season in 2017, Kindley started 10 games at right guard. After Georgia's regular season loss to Auburn he was replaced by Ben Cleveland, but Kindley won the starting job at left guard in 2018. Kindley was named a team captain in 2019. He started 10 games, missing a game against Tennessee with an ankle sprain. On January 7, 2020, Kindley announced that he would forgo his senior year and declared for the 2020 NFL Draft.

Professional career

Miami Dolphins
Kindley was selected by the Miami Dolphins in the fourth round (111th overall) of the 2020 NFL Draft. He was placed on the reserve/COVID-19 list by the team on August 6, 2020, and activated two days later.

On August 30, 2022, Kindley was waived by the Dolphins.

New York Giants
On October 5, 2022, Kindley was signed to the New York Giants practice squad. He signed a reserve/future contract on January 11, 2023.

References

External links
 Miami Dolphins bio

1997 births
Living people
Players of American football from Jacksonville, Florida
American football offensive guards
Georgia Bulldogs football players
Miami Dolphins players
New York Giants players